Laurence Anthony Kirwan (born 31 March 1952 in Liverpool) is a British doctor.

Education and career 

Kirwan graduated from the Victoria University of Manchester in 1974. He is a Fellow of the Royal College of Surgeons of England since 1979, trained in General Surgery at the Maimonides Medical Center in New York (1980-1981), and was a resident at Columbia Presbyterian Medical Center in New York (1981-1982).
Kirwan was a Fellow in Hand Surgery at the University of Colorado (1984-1985).

Kirwan has been indefinitely certified by the American Board of Plastic Surgery, Inc. (ASPS), he is certified in Hand Surgery (1990) and has been recertified in Hand Surgery. .  He practices Aesthetic Plastic Surgery in Norwalk, Connecticut and London, England. He was quoted in a 2002 New York ared in the press for his breast reduction operations on reality television personality Ulrika Jonsson and television presenter Kim Woodburn.

Kirwan uses a so-called breast "auto augmentation" technique.

Charity 
Working with AmeriCares in 1989, he organised charity surgery missions after the Spitak earthquake in Yerevan, Armenia. He organised charity surgery missions in war zones in Croatia (1993 and 1996) with UNESCO.
In 1989, Kirwan became the founding director of AmeriCares' 'Doctors for All Peoples'.

Honors 
The London Evening Standard, a free daily newspaper tabloid in London, named him as one of the 1000 Most Influential Londoners in 2007 and 2008. He is listed in Debrett's People of Today.

Publications

Books

Personal life

References 

1952 births
Living people
Medical doctors from Liverpool
British expatriates in the United States
Alumni of the Victoria University of Manchester
Fellows of the Royal College of Surgeons
British plastic surgeons